Below Deck Down Under is an Australian reality television series hosted by Peacock Original that premiered on March 17, 2022. The show is the 3rd spin-off of Below Deck, after Below Deck Mediterranean and Below Deck Sailing Yacht. Announced in February 2022, the series chronicles the lives of the crew members who work and reside aboard a 150-foot-plus superyacht during a charter season in Australia which consists of filming for around six weeks with the cast temporarily replacing the conventional crew. Viewers of Below Deck Mediterranean would recognise Aesha Scott from Seasons 4 and 5, but as a Stewardess. Frequent viewers of news in Australia may recognise Chambers. He was the captain of Superyacht Moatize as it crashed in Northern Queensland in 2019. Producers are already in talks about a second season to air in 2023.

Yachts

Summary 
 "Thalassa" (aka Keri Lee III [ex. Katharine]) built by American shipyard Trinity Yachts 2001 at 55.17m/181ft

Specifications

Cast

Season 1: Thalassa 
 Jason Chambers – Captain
 Ryan McKeown – Chef (episodes 1–14)
 Nate Post – Chef (episodes 14–17)
 Aesha Scott – Chief Stewardess
 Tumi Mhlongo – 2nd Stewardess
 Magda Ziomek – 3rd Stewardess (episodes 1–14)
 Taylor Dennison – 3rd Stewardess (episodes 14–17)
 Jamie Sayed – Bosun
 Culver Bradbury – Deckhand
 Brittini Burton – Deckhand
 Ben Crawley – Deckhand

Episodes

Broadcast 
Below Deck Down Under airs on Peacock in the U.S. and Hayu in the UK and Australia every Thursday. It began airing on the 17th of March, 2022 on Peacock and Hayu.

References

External links 

 
 

Below Deck (franchise)
Australian television spin-offs
Reality television spin-offs
Peacock (streaming service) original programming
English-language television shows
Television series by 51 Minds Entertainment
Television shows filmed in Australia
Television shows set in Queensland
2020s Australian reality television series
Australian television series based on American television series
2022 Australian television series debuts